Garry George "Jellybean" Johnson (born November 19, 1956) is an American drummer, guitarist, songwriter, producer and musician based out of Minneapolis, Minnesota. 
A member and drummer of The Time who worked along with famed producers Jimmy Jam and Terry Lewis. He went on to help record several songs with other artists including Alexander O'Neal, Cherrelle and most notably with Janet Jackson. In 1990, the two co-produced Jackson's #1 single, "Black Cat".

Biography
After the breakup of The Time, drummer and percussionist Jellybean Johnson decided to work as a producer, musician, and songwriter throughout his career. He became a long-time associate of Flyte Tyme productions. His first session job was being a musician for Alexander O'Neal's #11 R&B hit "Innocent" (produced by The Time bandmates Jimmy Jam and Terry Lewis). On this track, he was not only the drummer, but also delivered the guitar solos for the second half of the ten-minute long song. From this point on, he was in-demand as a session guitarist (and drummer/percussionist) for Janet Jackson, Alexander O'Neal, New Edition, and many others. Throughout his career, he has also produced a number of hits for Alexander O'Neal, New Edition and many others.  But it wasn't until 1990 when he would co-produce (with Janet Jackson) his biggest hit to date: Janet Jackson's Heavy Metal/Rock inspired #1 smash hit "Black Cat". He has also co-produced Mint Condition's entire debut album Meant to Be Mint.

Hits that Johnson produced and co-produced
Alexander O'Neal – "Criticize" (#4 R&B)
Nona Hendryx – "Why Should I Cry" (#5 R&B)
New Edition – "Crucial" (#4 R&B)
Janet Jackson – "Black Cat" (#1 Rock/#1 Pop/#10 R&B)
Mint Condition- "Breakin' My Heart (Pretty Brown Eyes)" (#3 R&B/#6 Pop) and "Forever in Your Eyes" (#7 R&B).

References

External links
Allmusic – Credits
InsightNews – Black Music Month profile: “Jellybean” Johnson

American funk guitarists
American male guitarists
Living people
Midwest hip hop musicians
Musicians from Minneapolis
The Original 7ven members
1956 births
Guitarists from Chicago
Guitarists from Minnesota
20th-century American guitarists
20th-century American male musicians